Events in the year 1961 in Bulgaria.

Incumbents 

 General Secretaries of the Bulgarian Communist Party: Todor Zhivkov
 Chairmen of the Council of Ministers: Anton Yugov

Events 

 The March Music Days, a festival held annually for two weeks in the second half of March in Rousse, Bulgaria, was established.

Sports 

 The 1961 Summer Universiade (II Summer Universiade), an international sporting event for university students, took place in Sofia.

References 

 
1960s in Bulgaria
Years of the 20th century in Bulgaria
Bulgaria
Bulgaria